Gaston Velle (1868–1953) was a French silent film director and pioneer of special effects, who was prominent in early French and Italian cinema during the first two decades of the 20th century. Like his father, the Hungarian entertainer Joseph "Professor" Velle, Gaston began his career as a travelling magician, before putting his illusionist skills to work in cinema and ultimately creating more than fifty films between 1903 and 1911. He worked under Auguste and Louis Lumière, before serving as the head of production for the Italian film studio Cines. But he is best remembered for his work at Pathé, where he was hired to produce trick films that might rival those of his contemporary, Georges Méliès, including classic shorts like Burglars at Work (1904). Some films pioneered lasting techniques, such as his Les Invisibles (1906) – the first known invisible man film.

Velle also created some of the first féerie films, such as tit-for-tat (1906). Additionally, Velle collaborated with other directors such as Segundo de Chomon and Ferdinand Zecca to create such silent film classics as the Moon Lover (1905), the Raja's Casket (1906), and the Hen that Laid the Golden Egg (1905), the latter of which was featured in the 1997 Martin Scorsese film, Kundun.

Velle mysteriously retired from film production in 1913, and little is known about the last several decades of his life. Still, Velle remained part of a prominent cinematic family. Most notably, his son Maurice Velle, a Parisian cinematographer, had a family with screenwriter Mary Murillo.

Filmography

 1904 – Dévaliseurs nocturnes
 1904 – La danse du Kickapoo
 1904 – Le paravent mystérieux
 1904 – La danse des apaches
 1904 – Danses plastiques
 1904 – Les dénicheurs d'oiseaux
 1904 – La métamorphose du papillon
 1904 – Japonaiseries
 1904 – La Valise de Barnum
 1904 – Métamorphose du roi de pique
 1904 – Un drame dans les airs
 1904 – Le Chapeau magique
 1905 – La poule aux œufs d'or
 1905 – Sidney, le clown aux échasses
 1905 – La fée aux fleurs
 1905 – Rêve à la lune ou L'amant de la lune
 1905 – Les cartes lumineuses ou Les cartes transparentes
 1905 – Ruche merveilleuse
 1905 – Coiffes et coiffures
 1905 – John Higgins, le roi des sauteurs
 1905 – L'antre infernal
 1905 – Un drame en mer
 1905 – L'аlbum merveilleux
 1906 – Le Bazar du Père Noël (Il Bazar di Natale)
 1906 – Onore rusticano 1906 – Il pompiere di servizio 1906 – Heures de la mondaine (Le ore di una mondana)
 1906 – Enlèvement à bicyclette (Il ratto di una sposa in bicicletta)
 1906 – Il dessert di Lulù 1906 – L'accordéon mysterieux (L'organetto misterioso)
 1906 – Bicyclette présentée en liberté 1906 – Mariage tragique (Nozze tragiche)
 1906 – Le garde fantôme 1906 – Les Invisibles 1906 – La Peine du talion 1906 – Les effets de la foudre 1906 – Cuore e patria 1906 – La fée aux pigeons 1906 – Quarante degrés à l'ombre (Quaranta gradi all'ombra) 
 1906 – Otello 1906 – Voyage autour d'une étoile 1906 – L'есrin du rajah 1906 – Les Fleurs animées 1907 – Petit Jules Verne 1907 – Le secret de l'horloger 1907 – Le petit prestidigitateur 1907 – Le secret de l'horloger (Patto infernale)
 1907 – Au pays des songes (Nel paese dei sogni)
 1907 – Artista e pasticciere 1907 – Gitane (La gitana)
 1907 – Pile électrique (La pila elettrica)
 1907 – Petit Frégoli (Il piccolo Fregoli)
 1907 – Fille du chiffonnier (La figlia del cenciaiolo)
 1907 – Primavera senza sole 1907 – Triste jeunesse (Triste giovinezza)
 1907 – Un moderno Sansone 1907 – Le crime du magistrat (Il delitto del magistrato) 
 1908 – Après le bal (Dopo un veglione)
 1908 – Lapins du docteur (I conigli del dottore)
 1908 – Confession par téléphone (La confessione per telefono)
 1908 – Première nuit de noces (La prima notte)
 1908 – Polichinelle (Le avventure di Pulcinella)
 1908 – Le spectre(Lo spettro)
 1908 – Dîner providentiel (Pranzo provvidenziale)
 1908 – Le triple rendez-vous(Triplice convegno) 
 1910 – Isis 1910 – Cagliostro, aventurier, chimiste et magicien 1910 – Au temps des Pharaons 1910 – La rose d'or 1910 – Le charme des fleurs 1910 – Le fruit défendu 1910 – L'oracle des demoiselles 1910 – Rêve d'art 1911 –  Fafarifla ou le fifre magique
 1911 –  L'armure de feu 1911 –  Le cauchemar de Pierrot
 1913 –  La nuit rouge''

References

External links
 YouTube: La peine du Talion (Tit-for-Tat) (1906)

1868 births
1953 deaths
French film directors
Cinema pioneers
French cinema pioneers